Ralph Avery (1907–1976) was an American landscape painter and watercolorist based in Rochester, New York.  He recorded city streets, churches, trees, iron fences, and the ambiance of Rochester, New York. He also painted in Mexico, the West Indies, Europe, and Northern Africa.

Early life
Avery painted since his childhood.  Born in Savannah, Georgia, Avery moved to Rochester in the early 1920s and studied at Rochester Institute of Technology (Athenaeum, and Mechanics Institute), earning his degree in 1928.  From 1930 to 1931, Avery studied at Louis C. Tiffany Foundation, Oyster Bay on a scholarship.  He studied with Charles Woodbury, Harry Leith-Ross, and Carl Peters, among others.  Avery taught in the Department of Applied Art at RIT for twenty five years.  By the time of his death in 1976, Avery had become one of the most identifiable and popular painters in Rochester.

Style of work
He mainly painted scenes from Rochester and the Corn Hill area including: gray-foggy views of the skyline, portraits of elegant old city homes and abstractions of natural areas.  Ralph Avery claims his work was heavily influenced by Japanese artists with simple, flat, decorative patterns and strong designs.  A friend of his, John Menihan stated, "Avery's total work did much to eliminate the line between commercial and fine art...he was so good he would win a prize in any company."

Rochester
When Avery first came to this region, he entered a Finger Lakes competition and was voted "most popular" and became the first recipient of the Rumrill-Hoyt Award.  Ralph Avery's paintings were mainly of Rochester and the Corn Hill area.  There is a section of Corn Hill dedicated in his memory called the Ralph Avery Mall.  This mall is a tribute to Avery's illustrations and paintings done in the Rochester area.  Ralph Avery found beauty in Rochester's dreary weather that most people complain about. To him, there was something beautiful about Rochester rain and snow.  A close friend, Mrs. Vera Fogg, described Avery when she said, "He saw beauty in the city all the time." He appeared in The Saturday Evening Post. Avery's artwork appeared on the cover of Reader's Digest fourteen times.

Ralph Avery resided at the Daughters of the American Revolution house on Livingston Park, and his studio was located at 60 North Fitzhugh Street in Rochester,

Famous works of art
The Statue of Mercury, messenger of god's and the highlight of Rochester, New York's city skyline though Avery's eyes, is one of his most well-known works. Avery's paintings appeared on many greeting card covers, calendars, and, as mentioned before, the cover of Reader's Digest.  The Bevier Gallery at Rochester Institute of Technology holds pieces from Avery's collection.  On December 4 to December 18 of 1976; 75 of his paintings were on display in this gallery in celebration of his life.

Avery's estate gave the Memorial Art Gallery (Rochester) over 450 pieces of his collection.  The collection includes sketches of how he came about some paintings, as well as tracings from photographs, among various styles of work.

Honors and awards
1954 - Pratt Purchase Prize
1954 - One-man exhibits at Smithsonian and National Collection of Fine Arts
1957 - Grumbacher Purchase Prize
1957 - Rudolf Lesch Fine Arts Purchase Prize
1960 - Named Fellow of Rochester Museum and Science Center
1967 - Outstanding Alumnus at Rochester Institute of Technology
Lilian Fairchild Award of University of Rochester
1976 – Arnot Art Gallery, Elmira, New York
1980 – Memorial Art Gallery, Rochester, New York

In September 1954, Avery's Plymouth Avenue Rain was displayed in America's Top 40.  His piece was chosen by the American Watercolor Society to be displayed in this show.

Affiliations with organizations
 Rochester Art Club
 Served as president from 1935 to 1938
 Print Club of Rochester
 Served as president from 1935 to 1936 and on the board of directors from 1936 to 1939.
 American Watercolor Society
 Associate member of the National Academy of Design

Credit:
Rochester Institute of Technology
His work can be found in the collections at the Memorial Art Gallery, the Newark Public Library, the Rochester Public Library, and the Bevier Collection at Rochester Institute of Technology.

References
A Rochester Retrospective (August 1 - September 21, 1980): Laura Stewart-Baran
Barbara O'Reilly
Brighton-Pittsford Post: December 9, 1976
Democrat and Chronicle: January 25, 1976
Memorial Art Gallery
Retrospective: May 1 - June 8, 1980
Times Union: January 27, 1976

https://web.archive.org/web/20070927100753/http://www.globalgallery.com/enlarge/026-35532/
http://www.tias.com/12872/PictPage/1922965895.html#images
http://www.askart.com/AskART/A/ralph_hillyer_avery/ralph_hillyer_avery.aspx
http://artoncampus.rit.edu/artist/41/

20th-century American painters
American male painters
1907 births
National Academy of Design associates
Rochester Institute of Technology alumni
1976 deaths
20th-century American male artists